Timespace: The Best of Stevie Nicks is a compilation album featuring songs from the solo career of American singer and songwriter Stevie Nicks. It was released on September 3, 1991. The album features many of her hit singles, along with three new songs: "Sometimes It's a Bitch" first single released from the album, co-written by Jon Bon Jovi), "Love's a Hard Game to Play" (co-written by Bret Michaels) and "Desert Angel" (which Nicks wrote for the men and women serving in the Gulf War). The CD's booklet contains notes written by Nicks herself about the making of each song.

The album debuted and peaked at number 30 on the US Billboard 200, Nicks' lowest charting album at the time, but it remained on the chart for nearly six months and, as of February 2011, the album had sold over 1.5 million copies in the United States. The album was certified Platinum by the Recording Industry Association of America (RIAA) in 1997. The album also achieved a Gold certification by the British Phonographic Industry (BPI) for shipping 100,000 copies in the United Kingdom and was Nicks' third top 20 album there. The album spent four weeks at number one in New Zealand. 

The Fleetwood Mac song "Silver Springs" (written by Nicks) was originally intended to be in the compilation, but Mick Fleetwood, the band's drummer, would not allow Nicks to release the song because of his plans to release it on a forthcoming Fleetwood Mac box set. This led to a dispute, resulting in Nicks leaving Fleetwood Mac for several years.

Critical reception

Track listing

Charts

Weekly charts

Certifications and sales

References

Stevie Nicks albums
1991 greatest hits albums
Albums with cover art by Jimmy Wachtel